Cheng Feiyi is a Chinese swimmer. At the 2012 Summer Olympics he finished 3rd in the first semifinal in the men's 100 metre backstroke, and finished in 8th place in the final.  He was also part of Chinese men's 4 x 100 m medley relay team at those Olympics.

References

1991 births
Living people
Chinese male backstroke swimmers
Swimmers from Liaoning
Olympic swimmers of China
Swimmers at the 2012 Summer Olympics
People from Fushun
Asian Games medalists in swimming
Swimmers at the 2010 Asian Games
Asian Games bronze medalists for China
Medalists at the 2010 Asian Games